The 1983 Virginia Cavaliers football team represented the University of Virginia during the 1983 NCAA Division I-A football season. The Cavaliers were led by second-year head coach George Welsh and played their home games at Scott Stadium in Charlottesville, Virginia. They competed as members of the Atlantic Coast Conference, finishing tied for fourth.

Schedule

A.Clemson was under NCAA probation, and was ineligible for the ACC title. Therefore this game did not count in the league standings.

References

Virginia
Virginia Cavaliers football seasons
Virginia Cavaliers football